The South African Railways Class MJ 2-6-6-0 of 1914 was a class of articulated steam locomotives.

Between 1914 and 1921, the South African Railways placed eighteen Class MJ Mallet articulated compound steam locomotives with a  wheel arrangement in branch line service.

Manufacturers
The Class MJ 2-6-6-0 Mallet articulated compound steam locomotive was designed by D.A. Hendrie, Chief Mechanical Engineer (CME) of the South African Railways (SAR) from 1910 to 1922, to meet the need for engines with a higher tractive effort to cope with heavy traffic on branch lines.

Ten of these branch line locomotives were ordered from Maffei of Munich but, as a result of the outbreak of the First World War, only two could be delivered from Germany in 1914, numbered 1651 and 1652.

The order for the remaining eight was then transferred to the North British Locomotive Company (NBL) in Scotland, who delivered them in 1917 and 1918, numbered in the range from 1653 to 1660. The entry for the Mallets in the NBL works register shows them as ordered on 20 April 1915 and delivered from February to March 2016. Those dates are probably ex works dates rather than actual delivery dates.

After cessation of hostilities in 1918, Maffei approached the SAR and requested that the balance of the original order, which had been built in 1914 but could not be delivered because of the war, also be accepted. These eight locomotives were delivered in 1921, numbered in the range from 1674 to 1681.

Characteristics
The locomotives had Walschaerts valve gear and were superheated, using the Schmidt type superheater. Unlike most of the other SAR Mallet classes, which had round-topped fireboxes, the Class MJ had Belpaire fireboxes.

The same tender was used by altogether fifteen other SAR locomotive Classes.

Reboilering
During 1939, while W.A.J. Day was the CME of the SAR, the Classes MJ and MJ1 were modified slightly to be reboilered with the same standard boiler, once again with Belpaire fireboxes.

Service
With its light axle loading, the Class MJ was intended for branch line working. Most of them were placed in service in the Eastern Cape, but four went to Natal and are believed to have worked on the Eshowe branch line. They gave satisfactory service on the Cape Eastern System where the moderate speeds required on the sections over which they worked enabled them to give reasonably good results.

Two of the locomotives, NBL-built no. 1655 and Maffei-built no. 1674, had the distinction of being the last two Mallet engines to remain in SAR service. They were scrapped in the East London workshops in 1962, after having worked on the branch line between Amabele and Umtata in Transkei for most of their service lives and then having spent their last years in shunting service in East London.

Works numbers
The known works numbers for the eight NBL-built locomotives are recorded as 21248 to 21255. However, these numbers are in conflict with the NBL works numbers 21246 to 21275 which were allocated to thirty 2-8-2T locomotives, numbered  and built by NBL for the Paris-Orleans Railway in France. Preceding and following NBL works numbers that are also in conflict with those recorded for the French locomotives are:
 Works numbers 21246 and 21247 of the last two of six 45-class 0-6-2T locomotives built for the Glasgow and South Western Railway in January 1916.
 Works numbers 21256 to 21275 of twenty named Prince of Wales class 4-6-0 locomotives built for the London and North Western Railway between October 1915 and January 1916.

In the official NBL builders list, the Paris-Orleans 2-8-2Ts are shown as ordered in September 1915 and delivered from March to June 1916. Their duplicated works numbers are listed as "progressive numbers" 21246A to 21275A.

The builders, works numbers, years of entering service and engine numbers of the Class MJ are listed in the table.

References

2290
2290
2-6-6-0 locomotives
(1C)C locomotives
Maffei locomotives
NBL locomotives
Cape gauge railway locomotives
Railway locomotives introduced in 1914
1914 in South Africa
Scrapped locomotives